Major-General Frederick Annesley Dudgeon  (1866–1943) was a British Army officer.

Military career
Dudgeon was commissioned into the South Lancashire Regiment on 29 August 1885. He served on the Western Front in the First World War as commanding officer of the 2nd Battalion, the South Lancashire Regiment from 1915, as commander of the 42nd Infantry Brigade from later that year and then as General Officer Commanding 56th (1/1st London) Division in August 1917. After the war he became commander of 8th Infantry Brigade in October 1919 and then General Officer Commanding the 50th (Northumbrian) Division from July 1923 until he retired in July 1927.

He was appointed a Companion of the Order of the Bath in the 1915 Birthday Honours.

References

|-

1866 births
1943 deaths
British Army generals of World War I
Companions of the Order of the Bath
South Lancashire Regiment officers
British Army major generals